Jurojin is a five-piece experimental rock music group from London, England formed in early 2008. The band incorporates various influences into its sound, including English folk, progressive rock, Indian classical, and heavy metal.  Jurojin is notable in its field for counting among its members a classically trained Tabla player.

The 2010 launch of Jurojin's first mini-album, The Living Measure of Time, has seen the band favoured by critics for balancing musically and rhythmically complex compositions with a distinctly accessible sound.

History 
Jurojin began recording its first songs shortly after its formation in 2008, which would later appear on their first release The Living Measure of Time.

In late 2009 the band formed their own record label Majestic Elder Recordings and signed an international distribution deal with ADA/Warner which led to an initial release of the album in select territories on 7 June 2010. An update posted on their website in late 2010 has set the further release in all territories to 7 March 2011.

The album has received favourable coverage and reviews across most media, with the UK's Kerrang! magazine calling it "one of the most unique albums of 2010", and Rock Sound magazine lauding its "display of maturity far in excess of the band’s apparent experience". Multiple tracks off The Living Measure of Time have been played on commercial radio, most notably on BBC Radio 1 in the UK and Triple J in Australia.

Music
Jurojin occasionally perform a variety of acoustic shows, during which the band focuses primarily on its Eastern and acoustic influences that prominently feature the Tabla. In an interview with TotalRock radio in the UK, guitarist Nicolas Rizzi stated that though some of their album tracks feature in these sets, the bulk of songs performed tend to be primarily acoustic songs and never feature in their heavy sets.  These are sometimes instrumental, with expanded or reduced lineups and various guest musicians.

2009 Barbican performance with Virpal Ghalley beatboxing.

Discography 
 The Living Measure of Time (2010)

Members 
 Nicolas Rizzi - Guitars
 Yves Fernandez - Bass
 Simran Ghalley - Tabla
 James Alper - Vocals
 Francesco Lucidi - Drums

Jurojin have recently collaborated with acclaimed violinist Anna Phoebe of Jethro Tull and Trans-Siberian Orchestra fame, and she can often be seen performing with the band at select live gigs. Likewise, members of Jurojin are part of Anna's solo band.

Occasional gigs in London can also be seen with Pach Pawar from the band Of The I or Emmanuel Rizzi (little brother of guitarist Nicolas) stepping in on second guitar.

In the band's early days their line-up included Jay Postones, of Heights and TesseracT, as a session drummer not only live but also in the studio, until the band found a permanent drummer, Francesco, for the position in 2010.

References

External links
Facebook Page

English experimental rock groups
Musical groups from London